"Prometo" is a song by Spanish singer-songwriter Pablo Alborán from his fourth studio album of the same name. It was written by Alborán and produced by Julio Reyes Copello. A "piano and strings version" (versión piano y cuerda) was released as the album's first promotional single on 13 October 2017. The song was released on 19 January 2018 as the album's third official single. Alborán described the song as the "most personal" song he's ever written.

Charts

References

2018 singles
Pablo Alborán songs
Songs written by Pablo Alborán
2017 songs
Warner Music Spain singles
Song recordings produced by Julio Reyes Copello